Mahmoud Al Baher (born 3 January 1994) is a Syrian footballer who plays for Jableh.

International career

International goals

References

External links

Mahmoud Al Baher at National-Football-Teams

 
 
 

1994 births
Living people
People from Jableh
Syrian Alawites
Syrian footballers
Mesaimeer SC players
Al-Jaish Damascus players
Zakho FC players
Tishreen SC players
Al-Nasr SC (Kuwait) players
Kuwait Premier League players
Qatari Second Division players
Syrian expatriate footballers
Association football forwards
Expatriate footballers in Iraq
Syrian expatriate sportspeople in Iraq
Expatriate footballers in Kuwait
Syrian expatriate sportspeople in Kuwait
Expatriate footballers in Qatar
Syrian expatriate sportspeople in Qatar
Association football wingers
Footballers at the 2018 Asian Games
Asian Games competitors for Syria
Syrian Premier League players
Syrian expatriate sportspeople in Bahrain
Expatriate footballers in Bahrain
Riffa SC players
Bahraini Premier League players